Mário César da Silva (1977) is a retired Brazilian football (soccer) player. He played in the 2010 Thai League Cup final and won a winner's medal after Thai Port defeated Buriram PEA F.C. 2–1. He was voted Thai Port's 2010 foreign player of the year.

References

External links
 Official Website
 

Living people
Brazilian footballers
1978 births
Expatriate footballers in Thailand
Mario Cesar
Brazilian expatriate sportspeople in Thailand
Penang F.C. players
Association football defenders